Rodney Rowe (born March 17, 1997) is an American track and field sprinter specializing in the 100 and 200 meters. Rowe competed at the collegiate level for North Carolina Agricultural & Technical State University where he was 2 Time All-American and 10 Time MEAC champion. He attended high school at Clayton High School in Clayton, North Carolina.

Amateur career 
In 2015, Rowe accepted an athletic scholarship to attend the North Carolina Agricultural & Technical State University in Greensboro, North Carolina, where he ran for coach Duane Ross' North Carolina A&T Aggies team in National Collegiate Athletic Association (NCAA) competition. As a freshman, Rowe was among the quartet that won the  relay in 39.58, setting a new record at the 2016 MEAC Championships. In addition to his performance in the relay, Rowe was a finalist in both the 100 and 200 meter races, placing 3rd (10.39) and 2nd (20.93) respectively. Rowe went on to compete at the 2016 NCAA Division I Championships as a member of the  relay team, but did not qualify for the finals.

Rowe and the 4 X 100 relay team qualified for the 2017 NCAA Outdoor Championships where they ran 38.48 during a qualifying round recording the ninth-fastest time in NCAA history. In the event finals, the team placed 3rd, behind teams from Houston and Auburn, with a time of 38.57.

In his junior season, Rowe won his first individual MEAC Championship when he won the Indoor  in 21.36s. He, along with his teammates, won the indoor 4 x 100 relay in 3:14.60 and Rowe placed 3rd in the indoor  in 6.74s. Rowe and the men's relay team, qualified for the 2018 NCAA Division I Indoor Championships in the 4 x 100 meter relay, however they failed to qualify for the finals. Rowe and his teammates also defended their  meter relay title, for the third consecutive time, running in 39.42 s. Rowe finished his junior season with the distinction of being one of two Aggies in school history to be a 3-time first-team All-American athlete.

In his senior season, Rowe became MEAC champion in the indoor 60 meters, running a time of 6.72 s. Rowe also claimed his 4th individual MEAC championship as he defended his 200-meter title, running a time of 21.42 s. Rowe qualified and competed in the 200 meters at the 2019 NCAA Indoor Championships. At the meet, Rowe would not advance to the finals, running a time of 21.03, which was 12th overall. In the outdoor season, Rowe won the 100 m, 200 m, and 4 X 100 meter relay titles at the MEAC Outdoor Championships. In the 100 meters, Rowe ran new personal best time of 10.15, in an exciting come from behind victory in the finals. He was also able to defend his title in the 200 meters, running another personal best time of 20.12, placing him second in the nation in the event. In the individual events, Rowe would not advance to the finals, placing 11th and 13th in the 100 and 200 meter races. In the relay event, Rowe and teammates made the finals where they placed 5th with a time of 38.59. Following the NCAA Championships, Rowe went on to compete for the United States at the NACAC Championships. Later in the season, Rowe competed in the 100 & 200 meter events at the 2019 USA Outdoor Track and Field Championships. Although he did not get an automatic spot on the United States World Championship team, by placing in the top 3 at the USA Championships, Rowe had already met the qualifying standard for the 200 meters prior to the meet and earned an invitation to represent the United States at the 2019 World Athletics Championships. At the World Championships, Rowe ran a time of 20.92 seconds, placing him 6th in his heat; which was not fast enough to qualify for the later rounds and ending his 2019 season.

Statistics 
Information from IAAF profile or Track & Field Results Reporting System unless otherwise noted.

Personal bests 

 All information taken from IAAF profile.

International championship results

National championship results

Notes

References

External links 

1997 births
Living people
People from Clayton, North Carolina
Track and field athletes from North Carolina
Sportspeople from North Carolina
American male sprinters
African-American male track and field athletes
North Carolina A&T State University alumni
North Carolina A&T Aggies men's track and field athletes
World Athletics Championships athletes for the United States
21st-century African-American sportspeople